The Women's madison competition at the 2018 UCI Track Cycling World Championships was held on 3 March 2018.

Results
120 laps (30km) with 12 sprints were raced.

References

Women's madison
UCI Track Cycling World Championships – Women's madison